Treadwell is an unincorporated community in Murray County, in the U.S. state of Georgia.

History
A variant name was "Amzi". A post office called Amzi was established in 1894, and remained in operation until 1909. In 1900, the community had 35 inhabitants.

References

Unincorporated communities in Murray County, Georgia
Unincorporated communities in Georgia (U.S. state)